, also titled Bushido: The Cruel Code of the Samurai and Cruel Tale of Bushido, is a 1963 Japanese drama and jidaigeki film directed by Tadashi Imai. It was entered into the 13th Berlin International Film Festival where it won the Golden Bear.

Plot
The story covers seven generations of a family, from the beginning of the Tokugawa shogunate to the early 19
60s, and the extremes its members take out of devotion and unswerving loyalty to lord, country or company, at the cost of their lives and those of close relatives. Susumu, the last in line of male heirs, finally decides against this stance after his fiancée's suicide attempt.

Cast
 Kinnosuke Nakamura as Jirozaemon / Iikura / Sajiemon / Kyutaro / Shuzo / Shingo / Osamu / Susumu
 Eijirō Tōno as Shibiku-Shosuke Hori
 Kyōko Kishida as Lady Hagi
 Masayuki Mori as Lord Tambanokami Munemasa Hori
 Shinjirō Ehara as Shibiku-Shosuke Yasutaka Hori
 Takeshi Katō
 Yoshiko Mita as Kyoko Hitomi
 Ineko Arima as Maki, Shuzo's wife
 Isao Kimura as Hirotaro Iguchi (as Ko Kimura)
 Michiko Araki as Shigeno, Kyutaro's mother
 Emiko Azuma as Hori Tamba's wife
 Yoshi Katō as Takahiro Hori
 Choichiro Kawarazaki as Young man at village
 Kikko Matsuoka as Sato, Shuzo's daughter
 Kō Nishimura as Yamaoka
 Masao Oda as Gohei
 Ryosuke Kagawa as Kōzuki Genza
 Satomi Oka as Fuji
 Nobuo Kawai as Shimoda
 Kei Satō as Saburobei Konoe
 Misako Watanabe as Yasu, Sajiemon's wife
 Kei Yamamoto as Kazuma Noda
 Eijirō Yanagi as Gonnosuke Shizuta

References

External links
 

1963 films
1963 drama films
Japanese drama films
Japanese black-and-white films
Films directed by Imai Tadashi
Films with screenplays by Yoshikata Yoda
Golden Bear winners
Jidaigeki films
Samurai films
1960s Japanese films